Daniel Chávez may refer to:

 Daniel Chávez (Peruvian footballer) (born 1988), Peruvian football striker
 Daniel Chávez (Bolivian footballer) (born 1990), Bolivian football midfielder
 Daniel Chávez (rower) (born 1946), Mexican rower
 Daniel Chávez (tennis) (born 1966), Guatemalan tennis player
 Daniel Chávez Morán (born 1951), Mexican real estate developer
 Daniel Chávez García (born 1970), Mexican politician